Lucky Dragon may refer to:

 Lucky Dragon No. 5 (film), a 1959 Japanese film directed by Kaneto Shindo
 Lucky Dragon Hotel and Casino, a defunct hotel and casino in Las Vegas, Nevada
 Daigo Fukuryū Maru, a Japanese fishing boat exposed to nuclear fallout from a 1954 weapon test at Bikini Atoll
 Lucky Dragons, an experimental music group based in Los Angeles, California
 Hyson or Lucky Dragon Tea
 Lucky Dragon, a surveillance operation by the US Air Force's 4080th Strategic Reconnaissance Wing during the Vietnam War